Live at The Record Exchange is an acoustic EP by American singer-songwriter Josh Ritter. It was recorded at the Record Exchange in Boise, Idaho on August 19, 2006. The EP features three songs from Ritter's 2006 album The Animal Years, two previously unreleased songs and a John Prine cover.

Track listing
All songs written by Josh Ritter, except "Daddy's Little Pumpkin" written by Pat McLaughlin and John Prine.

 "Peter Killed the Dragon" – 2:21
 "Girl in the War" – 4:15
 "Good Man" – 4:06
 "Bandits" – 2:46
 "Daddy's Little Pumpkin" – 2:19
 "Wolves" – 4:10

Personnel

Musicians
 Josh Ritter – vocals and guitar

Production
 Mixed by Jason Ringelstetter
 Mastered by Glenn Meadows

References

External links
Josh Ritter official website

2007 EPs
Josh Ritter albums